

The OQ-5 was a proposed target drone design in the United States.

Most likely it was intended to complement the OQ-2/-3 production by Radioplane and Frankfort, but was cancelled when the latter eventually produced enough targets.

See also

References

External links

1940s United States special-purpose aircraft
Unmanned aerial vehicles of the United States